The following is a list of the MTV Europe Music Award winners and nominees for Best Spanish Act.

Winners and nominees
Winners are listed first and highlighted in bold.

† indicates the Wildcard–winning artist.

2000s

2010s

2020s

See also 
 Telehit Awards
 LOS40 Music Awards

References

MTV Europe Music Awards
Spanish music awards
Awards established in 2000